Mujibur Rahman Howlader is a Bangladesh Awami League politician and the former Member of Parliament from Gopalganj-3.

Career
Howlader was elected to Parliament in February 1996 from Gopalganj-3 as a Bangladesh Awami League candidate. He is the Chairman of Kotalipara Upazila.

References

Awami League politicians
Living people
6th Jatiya Sangsad members
Year of birth missing (living people)